Bhutana Magwaza (born 23 December 1958) is a Swazi boxer. He competed in the men's light welterweight event at the 1984 Summer Olympics, ranking 17T.

References

External links
 

1958 births
Living people
Light-welterweight boxers
Swazi male boxers
Olympic boxers of Eswatini
Boxers at the 1984 Summer Olympics
Place of birth missing (living people)